Vavao Afemai (born 18 February 1992) is a Samoan rugby union player. He was named in Samoa's squad for the 2015 Rugby World Cup. He plays as a scrum-half.

References

1992 births
Living people
Samoan rugby union players
Samoa international rugby union players
Rugby union scrum-halves